A folding propeller is a type of propeller whose blades automatically fold out when the engine is turning, and then fold back (or "feather") when the engine stops. Folding propellers are found on sailing yachts, on model airplanes, and increasingly on self-launching gliders and small motor gliders, such as the Aériane Swift PAS.  Their purpose of folding propellers is to reduce drag when sailing or soaring, respectively.

Folding propellers are spun outwards by centrifugal force when the engine is turning, but when the engine stops, the pressure of airflow or waterflow forces the blades back. Typically, the blades are geared together so that they open and close in unison. Folding propellers used mainly to be two-bladed, but 3-bladed and 4-bladed versions are now available.

A self-feathering propeller is not more efficient than a fixed bladed prop, as neither type can adopt an optimal blade angle. Exceptions are the Brunton Autoprop and Darglow FeatherStream, which are not a typical folding propeller, but self-actuating variable-pitch propeller. On a boat, most propellers are much less effective in astern, and this is particularly true of folding propellers; whereas the Brunton AutoProp and Darglow FeatherStream are as effective astern as ahead.

The arguments for and against folding propellers are:

References

External links
Flexofold
Martec
Gori
Darglow

Propellers